Pleuropterantha is a genus of flowering plants belonging to the family Amaranthaceae.

Its native range is Northeastern Tropical Africa.

Species:

Pleuropterantha revoilii 
Pleuropterantha thulinii 
Pleuropterantha undulatifolia

References

Amaranthaceae
Amaranthaceae genera